St Dominic's Priory College is a Roman Catholic, independent, day, Reception to Year 12 Catholic Girls School located on Molesworth Street in North Adelaide, South Australia.

Overview 
The college is one of the earliest Dominican schools, established in 1883 by a group of Dominican Sisters who came to North Adelaide from Stone in Staffordshire, the foundress being Rose Columba Adams.  Today the college caters for approximately 680 students.

Notable alumnae  
 Fran Kellyradio presenter, current affairs journalist and political correspondent on ABC Radio National

See also 

 List of schools in South Australia
 Catholic education in Australia

References

External links 
St Dominic's Priory College website

Dominican schools in Australia
Educational institutions established in 1883
1883 establishments in Australia
Girls' schools in South Australia
Catholic secondary schools in Adelaide
Catholic primary schools in Adelaide